The EuropaChampionat was a Group 2 flat horse race in Germany open to three-year-old thoroughbreds. It was run at Hoppegarten over a distance of 2,400 metres (about 1½ miles), and it was scheduled to take place each year in August.

The event was established in 1992, and it was initially classed at Group 3 level. It was promoted to Group 2 status in 1995.

The EuropaChampionat remained at Hoppegarten until 2000. It was contested at Frankfurt over 2,450 metres in 2001, and discontinued in 2002.

Records
Leading jockey (2 wins):
 Mark Rimmer – Platini (1992), Kornado (1993)
 Andreas Boschert – Baroon (1997), Belenus (1999)

Leading trainer (3 wins):
 Bruno Schütz – Platini (1992), Kornado (1993), Flying Dream (1994)

Winners

See also
 List of German flat horse races

References

 Racing Post:

 galopp-sieger.de – EuropaChampionat.

Horse races in Germany
Flat horse races for three-year-olds
Recurring sporting events established in 1992
Discontinued horse races
Sport in Brandenburg